Svetlana Sergeyevna Cherkasova (born May 20, 1978) is a Russian middle-distance runner. In the 800 metres, she finished eighth at 2006 European Athletics Championships in Gothenburg. She also competed at the 2004 Olympics.

On 31 July 2008, Cherkasova was one of seven female Russian athletes suspended by the IAAF, due to doping test irregularities. On 20 October 2008, it was announced that Cherkasova, along with 6 other Russian athletes would receive two-year doping bans for manipulating drug samples.

Personal bests
800 metres - 1:56.93 (2005)
1500 metres - 4:05.55 (2003)

See also
List of doping cases in athletics
Doping at the Olympic Games
800 metres at the World Championships in Athletics
Russia at the World Athletics Championships
Doping at the World Athletics Championships

References 

 

1978 births
Living people
Russian female middle-distance runners
Olympic female middle-distance runners
Olympic athletes of Russia
Athletes (track and field) at the 2004 Summer Olympics
World Athletics Championships athletes for Russia
Russian Athletics Championships winners
Russian sportspeople in doping cases
Doping cases in athletics